This is a list of avant-garde and experimental films released in the 1980s.

Notes

1980s
Avant-garde